Longford is a town in the Gippsland region of Victoria, Australia.  According to the 2006 census, Longford and the surrounding area had a population of 929.

It was named Longford because of the long ford across the rivers to get into Sale. 

It is located at the junction of the South Gippsland Highway and the Longford-Rosedale Road, next to the Latrobe River.  A new bridge over the floodprone Latrobe River was completed in 2006, replacing the historic swinging bridge.  The road approach to the Sale Swing Bridge was prone to flooding, cutting the road to Sale, Victoria.

In September 1998, a large explosion at an Esso-operated oil and natural gas processing plant was responsible for an almost complete shutdown of Victoria's natural gas supply for weeks thereafter. At 12:25pm on 25 September 1998, the weld on GP905 cracked and the exchanger failed catastrophically, instantly killing two people. A Royal Commission subsequently found that Esso breached health and safety rules, and was responsible for the explosion.

References

3. Glimpses of Longford by Deanna Gunning (2010)

Towns in Victoria (Australia)
Shire of Wellington